The Palawan fairy-bluebird (Irena tweeddalii) is a species of bird in the family Irenidae. It is endemic to the island of Palawan in the Philippines.

Its natural habitats are subtropical or tropical moist lowland forest and subtropical or tropical moist montane forest.

References

Palawan fairy-bluebird
Birds of Palawan
Endemic birds of the Philippines
Palawan fairy-bluebird
Palawan fairy-bluebird